Myleus is a genus of serrasalmids from South America, where found in the Amazon, Orinoco and São Francisco basins, as well as river basin of the Guiana Shield. They are found in rivers with moderately  or fast-flowing water, including rapids. They are primarily herbivores, but also take some animal matter. Their strong teeth means that larger individuals can inflict severe bites on humans.

Species
There are currently 5 recognized species of Myleus. Several others have been moved to the genus Myloplus.

 Myleus altipinnis (Valenciennes, 1850)
 Myleus knerii (Steindachner, 1881)
 Myleus micans (Lütken, 1875)
 Myleus pacu (Jardine, 1841)
 Myleus setiger J. P. Müller & Troschel, 1844

References

Serrasalmidae
Taxa named by Johannes Peter Müller
Taxa named by Franz Hermann Troschel
Fish of South America